Lincoln Gap is a mountain pass in the Green Mountains of the U.S. state of Vermont.

At , Lincoln Gap is the highest vehicle-accessible mountain pass in Vermont. Lincoln Gap Road, which traverses the gap, is not plowed in the winter.

On the east side, Lincoln Gap is drained by Lincoln Brook, which drains into the Mad River, the Winooski River, and into Lake Champlain.
To the west, the gap is drained by Cota Brook, which drains into the New Haven River, Otter Creek, and into Lake Champlain.
In turn, Lake Champlain drains into the Richelieu River in Québec, thence into the Saint Lawrence River, and into the Gulf of Saint Lawrence.

The Long Trail, a 272-mile (438-km) hiking trail running the length of Vermont, crosses Lincoln Gap between Mount Grant  to the south and Mount Abraham  to the north. The Breadloaf Wilderness lies directly south of the gap.

References

Mountain passes of Vermont
Landforms of Addison County, Vermont
Landforms of Washington County, Vermont